Kantipur Gurkhas is a cricket team based in Kathmandu, Nepal that plays in the Nepal Premier League. The team is currently led by Basanta Regmi, and coached by Samson Jung Thapa. The team is owned by Kantipur Publications.

Kantipur Gurkhas, a professional cricket team owned by Kantipur Media Group, is a team of common Nepalese representing the cultural identity enrooted in common man and aspiration inbuilt in them to move ahead. Each Gurkha of this team resonates the joyfulness, passion, tolerance and rigidity of common Nepali citizen. Gurkhas as the legacy stands for courage and bravery. They possess qualities of loyalty, self sufficiency, physical strength resilience and orderliness. Led by one of the leading cricketers of the Nepali cricket team, Basanta Regmi, Kantipur Gurkhas is always ready to take on every Nepal Premier League challenge with equal zeal and enthusiasm living up to its motto "Playing to Lead".

Players

Current Squad of Kantipur Gurkhas 
 Basanta Regmi (c)
 Subash Khakurel
 Pradeep Airee  
 Gopal Singh
 Santosh Baral
 Antim Thapa
 Surendra Chand
 Bhanu prakash suryawanshi
 Akash Bista
 Prajwal Shahi
 Amrit Kumar Shrestha
 Lalit Dhami

References

External links 
 
 Cricnepal.com
 Cricketlok
 My Republica

Cricket teams in Nepal
Everest Premier League
Cricket clubs established in 2014
2014 establishments in Nepal